The AfroBasket All-Tournament Team is a FIBA award given every two years, awarded to the five strongest competitors throughout the tournament.

Honourees

See also
 FIBA AfroBasket Most Valuable Player
 FIBA Basketball World Cup Most Valuable Player
 FIBA Basketball World Cup All-Tournament Team
 FIBA Awards

References 

Team
Basketball trophies and awards